Sebe Coulibaly (born 9 February 1994) is a French-born Malian footballer who plays as a midfielder for RC Saint-Denis and the Mali women's national team.

She played for Mali at the 2016 Africa Women Cup of Nations, scoring for Mali in the match against Kenya.

She has played for RC Saint-Denis since 2017. She had previously played for Tremblay FC and AS Saint-Étienne.

References

External links

1994 births
Living people
Citizens of Mali through descent
Malian women's footballers
Women's association football midfielders
Women's association football forwards
Mali women's international footballers
Footballers from Paris
French women's footballers
AS Saint-Étienne (women) players
Division 1 Féminine players
Black French sportspeople
French sportspeople of Malian descent